The fringe-tailed gerbil (Gerbilliscus robustus) is a species of rodent found in Central African Republic, Chad, Eritrea, Ethiopia, Kenya, Niger, Somalia, Sudan, Tanzania, Uganda, possibly Cameroon, and possibly Nigeria. Its natural habitats are dry savanna, moist savanna, subtropical or tropical dry lowland grassland, arable land and urban areas.

References
Musser, G. G. and M. D. Carleton. 2005. Superfamily Muroidea. pp. 894–1531 in Mammal Species of the World a Taxonomic and Geographic Reference. D. E. Wilson and D. M. Reeder eds. Johns Hopkins University Press, Baltimore.

Gerbilliscus
Mammals described in 1825
Taxonomy articles created by Polbot